Darren John Grimwade (born 3 April 1980) is an Australian politician. He was an LNP member of the Legislative Assembly of Queensland from 2012 to 2015, representing the electorate of Morayfield.

Grimwade was born in Redcliffe. He worked as a baker and as a director of a taxation franchise before buying a pizza café in Burpengary in 2007, which he was operating at the time of his election to parliament. He was awarded Queensland Young Entrepreneur of the Year in 2008.

Grimwade was elected to the Legislative Assembly at the 2012 state election, defeating Labor MP Mark Ryan.

In the 2015 state election, Grimwade was unsuccessful in his re-election bid for the seat of Morayfield, and was succeeded by the former member for Morayfield, Mark Ryan, who Grimwade defeated in 2012. 

In 2016, Grimwade was elected as a local Councillor to the Moreton Bay Regional Council, representing Division 11.

At the 2020 Local Government Elections, Grimwade was returned to the Moreton Bay Regional Council, again representing Division 11 with a 76.52% primary vote.

References

Liberal National Party of Queensland politicians
1980 births
Living people
Members of the Queensland Legislative Assembly
21st-century Australian politicians